Leptuca deichmanni, commonly known as Deichmann's fiddler crab, is a species of fiddler crab native to the eastern Pacific coast of Central America, in Costa Rica and Panama.

Taxonomy

Previously a member of the genus Uca, the species was transferred in 2016 to the genus Leptuca when Leptuca was promoted from subgenus to genus level.

Description
Crabs are normally 9-9.5mm in carapace width. The carapace is strongly arched and is greenish brown to pale gray in color. The minor cheliped has a wide gape. Females have thin ambulatory legs.

Habitat
The species prefers open, bay shores with either muddy sand substrate containing some small stones or pure sand substrate containing some large stones.

References

Ocypodoidea
Crustaceans described in 1935